A professional shogi player (将棋棋士 shōgi kishi or プロ棋士 puro kishi "professional player") is a shogi player who is usually a member of a professional guild of shogi players.

There are two categories of professional players: regular professional and women's professional. All regular professional shogi players are members of the Japan Shogi Association (JSA). However, only regular professional players, who are all male, are considered to be full-fledged members. Women's professional players belong to groups distinct from regular professional players. In Japanese, the term 棋士 kishi only refers to regular professional players to the exclusion of women's professionals, who are termed 女流棋士 joryū kishi.

History

Titles such as Meijin were hereditary and could only be held by members of these three families. These three schools were supported by the Tokugawa shogunate and thus controlled the professional shogi world up until 1868 when the Meiji Restoration took place. By the time , the eighth and last head of the Itō school and the 11th Hereditary Meijin, died in 1893, the influence of the families had decreased to such an extent that they had no real power at all.

Ranking

All shogi players are ranked by a dan system. In the current system, apprentice players become professional when they achieve the rank of 4-dan. Apprentice players aspiring to become professionals are ranked from 6-kyū to 3-dan. Amateur and professional dan ranks are not equivalent with amateur 3- to 5-dan being roughly equivalent to apprentice professional 6-kyū and amateur 2- to 4-dan being roughly equivalent to women's professional 2-kyū.

Unlike western chess, shogi players do not have official Elo ratings although unofficial Elo scores may be calculated by shogi fans. Unlike Elo scores which may increase or decrease, players who achieve a certain dan are never demoted to a lower dan. Thus, the dan system may be thought as a performance milestone indicator or somewhat like the peak Elo rating that is used in western chess.

Apart from the dan system, players are also ranked according to their results in the Meijin ranking tournament. Their performance in the ranking tournament may also affect their ranking in the dan system. Unlike the dan system, a player may be demoted to a lower Meijin ranking tournament class (as well as promoted).

Professional players

JSA professional shogi players (正規棋士 seiki kishi or 棋士 kishi for short) are ranked from four to nine dan. Players receive a monthly salary according to their rank as well as game fees based upon performance, which historically have mostly come from media conglomerates in exchange for exclusive publishing rights. 
In addition, popular players may also earn income from teaching, publishing, media appearances, etc. , there are 167 active professionals.

The  is a voluntary organization operating with the JSA made up of all current regular professionals and some JSA women's professionals. It was founded in 2009 and helps organize events designed to further the spread of shogi as well as foster training and professionalism among shogi professionals.

Training group system
The JSA offers official "training" or "study" groups (研修会 kenshūkai) in Tokyo, Osaka, Nagoya, Fukuoka, Sendai and Sapporo where promising young amateur players can play instructional games against shogi professionals as well as official ranking games against other players of similar strength. These groups are open to all amateur-dan-ranked male and female players aged 20 years (25 years for females wanting to become a women's professional. In this case a master is required) and under who can pass the entrance examination and pay the required tuition and other fees. Players are divided into seven groups from S to F according to playing strength: S is the top group, while the strength of a typical Group F player is generally considered to be amateur 2-dan. Each group is further divided into two sub-groups, 1 and 2, with promotion and demotion from one group or sub-group to another being determined by actual game results. Players who perform at high levels in the top groups can qualify for entry into the Apprentice School (for Group S or A2, depending upon age) or provisional women's professional status (for Group C1) if they satisfy certain other conditions.

Apprenticeship

Strong amateurs wishing to become professional must be accepted into the JSA's Apprentice School (新進棋士奨励会 shinshin kishi shōreikai). Apprentice professionals are initially ranked from 6-kyū to 3-dan based upon their results on the apprentice school entry exam or performance in certain amateur tournaments. 
Apprentices are guided through the system by their master (師匠 shishō)a currently active professional who acts as their sponsor and teacherand are promoted or demoted in rank based upon performance.

Players who successfully move up the ranks to 3-dan participate in the 3-dan League (三段リーグ san-dan riigu). This league is held twice yearly and the two top finishers of each league are promoted to 4-dan, thus gaining professional status. 
The 3-dan League was established in 1987 with an initial limit of four players qualifying for 4-dan promotion in response to a concern that the average of five to six new professionals every year was diluting the professional pool.

Amateurs of either gender can apply for entry into the apprentice school, but they must be promoted to 1-dan by age 21 and 4-dan by age 26 and those who are not must leave the school. Those newly promoted to 3-dan are given at least five chances to obtain promotion to professional status in the 3-dan League, with anyone under age 29 who can maintain a win rate over 50% in 3-dan League being allowed to stay. Anyone over age 21 who drops from 1-dan to 1-kyū must achieve promotion to 1-dan again in six months or leave the school.

In August 2019, the JSA clarified its position on current women's professional shogi players who obtain "regular" professional status via the apprentice school system. The JSA stated that women's professional shogi players who qualify for "regular" shogi professional status through the 3-dan league will be given the option of retaining their women's professional status and continuing to participate in women-only tournaments as long as they request to do so within two weeks of the date they are officially awarded regular professional status.

Professional Admission Test 

There is an alternative way for amateurs to obtain professional status called the Professional Admission Test (プロ編入試験 puro henyū shiken) which was established by the JSA in 2006 in response to a former apprentice school 3-dan's successful attempt to become a professional. Shōji Segawa was unable to gain promotion to 4-dan professional before turning 26 in 1996, and thus was required to withdraw from the JSA's apprentice school. Segawa continued to play shogi as an amateur and won a number of national amateur tournaments which allowed him to qualify for tournaments involving professionals. Segawa's record of 17 wins and  5 losses against professionals in these tournaments led him to request that the JSA grant him another opportunity to become a professional. In response, the JSA made an ad hoc arrangement of six games for Segawa to play against a variety of opponents and stated that he would be granted 4-dan professional status if he won three games. Segawa's opponents included four professional players, one women's professional player, and one apprentice school 3-dan. The games were held from July to November 2005, and Segawa achieved his third win by winning game 5 on November 6, 2005 and was granted professional status by the JSA on the same day. Decades before Segawa,  also passed an ad hoc test to gain professional status. In 2014, the JSA announced the qualifications for those wishing to apply for the Professional Admission Test. In July 2014, the JSA announced that it had accepted the application submitted by amateur Kenji Imaizumi, a 41-year-old former apprentice school 3-dan. Imaizumi became the first amateur to successfully obtain professional status under the new system in December 2014. On February 25, 2020, Shōgo Orita, a former 3-dan apprentice school player who has a popular YouTube channel, became the second person under the new system and the fourth amateur overall to obtain professional status.

In August 2019, the JSA clarified its position on the test as it pertains to current women's professional shogi players. The JSA stated that women's professional shogi players who successfully pass the test to obtain "regular" shogi professional status will retain their women's professional status and can continue to participate in women-only tournaments.

Women's professionals 

Women's professional players are in groups distinct from regular professional players. Currently, no female has yet qualified to become a regular professional although over the years there have been 20 female apprentice professionals competing to obtain such status.   is the only female apprentice participating in the 3-dan League.

There are two guilds of women's professionals: the  Japan Shogi Association guild and the Ladies Professional Shogi-players' Association of Japan guild. Before the creation of the guilds, women were historically not allowed to become professional players.

JSA

The JSA has a separate system for women's professionals (女流棋士 Joryū Kishi) and ranks them from 3-kyū to 6-dan. Women's professionals are ranked and promoted differently than professionals (kishi) by the JSA. , there are 58 active JSA women's professionals. Strong women's professionals are able to participate in some tournaments with men, but most professional tournaments are restricted to regular professionals. However, there are also major title matches and other tournaments for women only. Many of the women's tournaments are also open to the public for amateur female players who are not members of the JSA or LPSA. Until the 1990s, the strongest women's professionals were considered to be roughly equivalent to 1- or 2-dan apprentices in playing strength. Now, the strongest women's professionals are close to professional level, playing equivalent to 3-dan apprentices.

Strong female amateur players aged 25 or under who wish to become a women's professional must be accepted into the JSA's Kenshūkai (研修会 "training group"). Female amateurs who are promoted to Class C1 are granted the rank of provisional women's professional 3-kyū. 
Those achieving the provisional rank of 3-kyū have two years to gain promotion to the rank of 2-kyū and thus obtain regular women's professional status.

Prior to 1984, women's professionals were determined by their performance in national tournaments. From 1984 until March 2009, amateurs aspiring to become women professionals competed against each other in the Women's Professional Apprentice League (女流育成会 Joryū Ikuseikai), a system similar to the 3-dan League of the Professional Apprentice School. The winner of the league was promoted to women's professional 2-kyū. In April 2009, the JSA disbanded this system and merged it into the training group system.

Akiko Takojima joined the JSA in 1974 becoming the first women's professional. She was also the first female to join the Apprentice School and reached 1-dan before withdrawing. She later left the JSA to join the LPSA.

Naoko Hayashiba became the first women's professional to defeat a regular professional in 1991, but it was in an unofficial game. Hiroe Nakai became the first women's professional to defeat a regular professional in an official game in 1993.

In February 2017, Karolina Styczyńska became the first non-Japanese to be awarded full professional status when she was promoted to the rank of women's professional 2-kyū.

The association was founded in 1989 and helps organize events involving JSA women's professionals designed to further the spread of shogi.

LPSA

Other women's professional players are members of the Ladies Professional Shogi-players' Association of Japan (LPSA), which is a professional guild of women's professionals separate from the JSA. The LPSA was formed in 2007 due to disagreements between women's professionals and the JSA over money and governance.

Promotion
Regular professionals (kishi) are ranked from 4- to 9-dan. All new professionals start at 4-dan and are subsequently promoted based upon criteria established by the JSA. A similar system exists for women's professionals who have their own separate ranking system from 2-kyū to 6-dan. Satisfying one of the required criteria is sufficient for promotion. The JSA board of directors may also promote active professionals for exemplary results, etc. when deemed appropriate, and upon their official retirement in consideration of the number of years active, etc.

Regular professional status
The promotion criteria for regular professionals are as follows.

Women's professional status
The promotion criteria for women's professionals are as follows.

Tournaments
Professional players compete in a number of title tournaments as well as non-title tournaments. The two most prestigious are the tournaments for the Meijin title and the Ryūō title.

Titles

There are eight major title tournaments and several non-title tournaments held yearly for regular professionals. Some of these tournaments are also open to qualifying women's professionals and amateur players.  The oldest is the Meijin, which is historically connected to the hereditary title system established in the 17th century during the time of the Tokugawa shogunate and later became a tournament title in 1937. The newest title tournament is the Eiō, which became a title tournament in 2017.

Title tournaments
Below are the names of the title tournaments along with the current titleholders.

Non-title tournaments
The following are the current non-title tournaments.

Women's tournaments
There are eight major title tournaments as well as several non-title tournament held for women's professionals, and some of these are open to female amateur players.

Title tournaments
Below are the names of the title tournaments along with the current titleholders.

Non-title tournaments
The following are the current non-title tournaments.

Computer shogi

Human versus computer

In October 2005, professional players were instructed that they were banned from playing public games against computers without the permission of the JSA. The JSA said the reason for doing this was due to the increasing strength of shogi software programs and concerns that even a single professional player losing to a computer could give the public the impression that professionals "are weaker than the software". It was also believed that the JSA wanted to have more control over any future commercial opportunities associated with such games, and was asking "organizers pay a sponsorship fee of at least ¥100 million per game".  :Kunio Yonenaga, the JSA president who instituted the ban, later elaborated on the reasons for the ban in a 2011 interview by saying, "If a professional shogi player wins a match against a computer, it's no news. But when a pro loses, it turns into a big deal".

A number of official games between professionals and computers have taken place since the ban went into effect. In March 2007, reigning Ryūō titleholder Akira Watanabe defeated the program "Bonanza" in the first official game since the ban was instituted, but women's professional Ichiyo Shimizu became the first professional, man or woman, to lose to a computer in an official game when she lost to "Akara 2010" in October 2010. In January 2012, the program "Bonkras" defeated then JSA president and retired former Meijin Yonenaga. Shin'ichi Satō became the first active male professional to lose to a computer when he lost to the program "Ponanza" in March 2013, and Hiroyuki Miura became the first active "Class A" professional to lose to a computer when he lost to the program "GPS Shogi" in April 2013. Miura was participating in a match between five active male professionals and five computer programs held in March and April 2013. The match was won by the computers with a score of three wins, one draw and one loss. A second team match was held in March and April 2014 with the computers winning four out of the five games played. A third team match was held in March and April 2015 with the professionals winning three games and losing two.

In June 2015, it was decided that the team match format was to be replaced by a two-game match (two days per game) between the winners of respective human and computer qualifying tournaments sponsored by the JSA and telecommunications company Dwango. Takayuki Yamasaki and the program "Ponanza" started the best-of-two game 1st Denō Match in April 2016, and Yamasaki lost the match 20.

On February 22, 2017, the JSA announced that the "Denou Sen" matches between computers and professional players sponsored by Dwango would end in 2017. According to the chairman of Dwango, "These serious battles between humans and software have completed their historic role". On April 1, 2017, Meijin Amahiko Satō became the first reigning major titleholder to lose an official game to a computer when he lost Game 1 of the 2nd Denō Match to the computer representative Ponanza.

Human versus human

In October 2016, the JSA announced new rules which require players to keep their smartphones or other electronic devices in their lockers during official match games. Players will also be banned from leaving the JSA buildings in Tokyo and Osaka during official games. The JSA said the new rules were needed to prevent "high-tech cheating" by players using shogi apps installed on the devices themselves or from using the devices remotely access off-site personal computers for assistance during games. The move was made in response to the increasing strength of computer software in recent years, including a number of results where computers have beaten professional players in official games. As computer shogi programs have gotten stronger, the number of players using them for match preparation and post-game analysis has increased, giving rise to concerns about the possibility of cheating during games. The new rules took effect in December 2016.

On February 10, 2017, the JSA announced that two professional players were the first to be fined for leaving the playing site during official games under the new rules. The two players were spotted by others leaving the playing site during their meal breaks for official games held on February 7 and February 8, 2016, respectively. The JSA fined each player 50% of the amount they were to receive as a game fee and strongly warned them to avoid making the same mistake again.

List of professional players

See also

 Japan Shogi Association

Notes

References

External links
 Shogi Fan: What is the rank system (dan) for Shogi?
 LPSA: 日本女子プロ将棋協会 
 shogidata.info · shows statistics for each professional player 
 Japan Shogi Association: 
 Dan promotion rules 
 Players close to promotion
 Shogi Hub: Master–Pupil Diagram